Jhumura (2015) is a Bengali film written and directed by debutant director Anindya Chatterjee and produced by Ultimax Productions Private Limited. This film is a lyrical saga that revolves around the life, love and struggles of Jhumur (a folk art form) performers of Bengal. The film features Samadarshi Dutta, Sohini Sarkar, Sabitri Chatterjee, Parthasarathi Chakrabarty and others. The film was released on 24 April 2015.

Cast 

 Samadarshi Datta as Riwk/Kanchan
 Sohini Sarkar as Sahana/Kusum
 Sabitri Chatterjee as Fullora
 Parthasarathi Chakrabarty as Guide/Palan
 Sourav Chakrabarty Sandy/Nuna
 Tania Kar Riya/Bakul

Soundtrack 

The music has been composed by Pijush Chakrabarty, Subrata Das, Brahma-Khyapa and Ayan Banerjee.

References

External links 
 
 

2015 films
Bengali-language Indian films
2010s Bengali-language films